Angela Masi (born ) is an Italian politician affiliated with the Five Star Movement. She began her term in the Chamber of Deputies on 23 March 2018.

Life 
Angela Masi was born on January 10, 1987, in the Italian city Bari. After graduating in 2005 from Italian high school Istituto Professionale Statale per i Servizi Commerciali e Turistici (IPSSCT) "Nino Lorusso", located in Altamura, Angela Masi enrolled in the economics degree course at the University of Bari, where she graduated in 2012 with a score of 110/110 cum laude.

Over her career, she managed to organize study and work, working either as a receptionist, employee or manager. In particular, she became involved in an innovative (yet short-lived) project, i.e. a refilling station for detergents and food (whose name was Tuttosfuso), aimed at reducing the production of waste generated by empty containers.

Both as a citizen and as a deputy of Italian Parliament, she exhibited great sensitivity to topics such as environmental protection, the enhancement of her native region Apulia and the so-called "reshoring" of Italian companies.

References

External links 
XVIII Legislatura - Deputati e Organi - Scheda deputato - MASI Angela Italian Parliament - Angela Masi]

Living people
Five Star Movement politicians
Politicians of Apulia
University of Bari alumni
1987 births
People from Bari
Deputies of Legislature XVIII of Italy
21st-century Italian women politicians
Women members of the Chamber of Deputies (Italy)